Frank Grey (1878–1954) was a South African cricket umpire. He stood in ten Test matches between 1910 and 1922.

See also
 List of Test cricket umpires

References

1878 births
1954 deaths
Place of birth missing
South African Test cricket umpires